Church of the Most Sacred Heart of Jesus is a Roman Catholic church in Šančiai elderate of Kaunas, Lithuania.

Gallery

References

20th-century Roman Catholic church buildings in Lithuania
Roman Catholic churches in Kaunas